The FIBA Hall of Fame honors players who have shown exceptional skill at basketball, all-time great coaches, referees, and other major contributors to the sport.

Inductees
Key:

Male players
In total, 60 individuals, have been inducted as male players.

Male teams

Female players
In total, 21 individuals, have been inducted as female players.

Male coaches
In total, 24 individuals, have been inducted as male coaches.

NB:
 Newell was born in Canada, but became a U.S. citizen as a young adult, and made his coaching mark in the U.S.
 In addition, Newell is a member of the Naismith Memorial Hall of Fame, as a contributor, not as a coach.

Female coaches
In total, 6 individuals, have been inducted as female coaches.

Technical officials (referees)
In total, 14 individuals, have been inducted as technical officials.

Contributors

National federations (8)
The original eight founding member national basketball federations of FIBA, in 1932.

Inductees (35)

Current candidates
These basketball players and coaches are eligible candidates to possibly become FIBA Hall of Fame inductees in the future.

Male player candidates (59)

 Waldemar Blatskauskas
 Alfredo da Motta
 Zenny "Algodão" de Azevedo 
 Ruy de Freitas 
 Carmo "Rosa Branca" de Souza 
 Marcel de Souza
 Edson Bispo dos Santos 
 Affonso Évora
 Carlos "Mosquito" Domingos Massoni 
 Wlamir Marques 
 Jatyr Eduardo Schall 
 Antônio Salvador Sucar 
 Rūdolfs Jurciņš 
 Juris Kalniņš 
 Jānis Krūmiņš 
 Valdis Muižnieks 
 Juris Silarājs 
 Gunars Siliņš 
 Maigonis Valdmanis 
 Sergejus Jovaiša 
 Artūras Karnišovas 
 Rimas Kurtinaitis
 Frank Lubin (Pranas Lubinas)
 Arvydas Macijauskas
 Saulius Štombergas 
 Dejan Bodiroga 
 Predrag Danilović 
 Aleksandar Đorđević
 Žarko Paspalj 
 Boris Kristančič 
 Peter Vilfan 
 Aljoša Žorga 
 Magic Johnson 
 Bob Kurland 
 Bob Morse 
 Jerry West 
 Fanis Christodoulou 
 Georgios Kolokithas 
 Iliya Mirchev 
 Konstantin Totev 
 Richard Dacoury 
 Alain Gilles 
 Raymond Dalmau 
 Juan "Pachín" Vicéns 
 Mieczysław Młynarski 
 Sergei Tarakanov 
 Gennadi Volnov 
 Ed Palubinskas 
 Leo Rautins 
 Dino Rađa
 Pedro Chappé
 Ivan Mrázek 
 Nicolás Lapentti 
 János Greminger 
 Aidin Nikkhah Bahrami
 Arturo Guerrero 
 Rik Smits  
 Francisco "Nino" Buscató 
 Manute Bol

Female player candidates (34)

  Marlene José Bento
  Maria "Heleninha" Helena Campos
  Maria Helena Cardoso 
  Laís Elena Aranha da Silva 
  Nilza Monte Garcia 
  Delcy Ellender Marques
  Norma "Norminha" Pinto de Oliveira 
  Dzintra Grundmane 
  Helēna Bitnere-Hehta 
  Silvija Ravdone-Krodere 
  Maija Saleniece-Siliņa 
  Skaidrīte Smildziņa-Budovska 
  Dzidra Uztupe-Karamiševa 
  Catarina Pollini 
  Mara Fullin 
  Liliana Mabel Bocchi
  Angelė Rupšienė 
  Jurgita Štreimikytė-Virbickienė 
  Vida Šulskytė-Beselienė
  Nina Poznanskaya 
  Tatyana Ovechkina 
  Olga Sukharnova 
  Lauren Jackson 
  Robyn Maher 
  Lenke Kiss 
  Katrina McClain 
  Lynette Woodard 
  Adriana Bilik-Biermaier 
  Penka Stoyanova 
  Liu Yumin 
  Yannick Souvré 
  Mame Maty Mbengue 
  Marija Veger Demšar 
  Elisabeth Cebrián

Male coach candidates (17)

 Božidar Maljković 
 Željko Obradović 
 Oļģerts Altbergs 
 Valdemārs Baumanis 
 Raimonds Karnītis 
 Dimitar Mitev 
 Ivan Galabov 
 Sandro Gamba 
 Valerio Bianchini 
 Witold Zagórski 
 Ludwik Miętta 
 Joë Jaunay 
 Nikos Nissiotis 
 Julio Toro 
 Zmago Sagadin 
  David Blatt

See also
 FIBA Hall of Fame
 Naismith Memorial Basketball Hall of Fame
 List of members of the Naismith Memorial Basketball Hall of Fame
 List of players in the Naismith Memorial Basketball Hall of Fame
 List of coaches in the Naismith Memorial Basketball Hall of Fame
 EuroLeague Hall of Fame
 College Basketball Hall of Fame
 Women's Basketball Hall of Fame
 Italian Basketball Hall of Fame
 Greek Basket League Hall of Fame
 French Basketball Hall of Fame
 VTB United League Hall of Fame
 Finnish Basketball Hall of Fame
 Australian Basketball Hall of Fame
 Philippine Basketball Association Hall of Fame

References

External links
 FIBA Hall of Fame Official website
 Official Inductee List

FIBA Hall of Fame

FIBA Hall of Fame